Kristian Mamush Andersen (born 1 September 1994) is a Danish professional footballer who plays for Hillerød Fodbold.

Career

Brøndby IF
Kristian Andersen made his debut (in jersey number 36) on 10 March 2013 in the 3-0 away win against AGF. Kristian had three more appearances as substitute doing the season which became 70 minutes i total.

On 14 March 2013, Kristian signed a new two-year Brøndby IF contract, which ties him to the club until the summer 2015.

Kristian Andersen got officially promoted to the first team 1 July 2013 and handed jersey number 25.

With only 1 league match played in the 2013/14 season, and the players agent revealed, that they were looking for a club to send him out on loan to. Andersen expressed in June 2016, that he would like to leave the club to find more playingtime.

Andersen revealed in June 2016, that he wouldn't extend his contract with Brøndby IF and he therefore would leave the club in the window.

Loan to HB Køge
On 24 July 2014 HB Køge confirmed, that they had signed Andersen on a season long loan deal. He quickly became a regular part of the squad and played 28 league games for the club.

HB Køge
On 30 June 2016 HB Køge confirmed, that they had signed Andersen on a permanently deal. His contract was extended in October 2016 until 2018. He left the club upon the expiration of his contract, playing 92 league games for Køge, scoring 7 goals.

IK Brage
On 23 July 2018, Andersen moved abroad for the first time in his career, signing with IK Brage in Superettan, Sweden's second tier. He left the club by mutual agreement on 28 January 2021.

Kolding IF
After leaving Brage, Andersen returned to Denmark and joined Danish 1st Division club Kolding IF on a deal for the rest of the season. The season ended with relegation to the 2nd Division for Kolding and Andersen left the club at the end of his contract.

NSÍ Runavík
In March 2022, Andersen moved to Faroese club NSÍ Runavík.

Hillerød
On 8 June 2022 it was confirmed, that Andersen had signed with newly promoted Danish 1st Division club, Hillerød Fodbold.

Career statistics

References

External links
 Kristian Andersen DBU-statistics
 

1994 births
Living people
Danish men's footballers
Danish expatriate men's footballers
Denmark youth international footballers
Akademisk Boldklub players
Brøndby IF players
HB Køge players
IK Brage players
Kolding IF players
NSÍ Runavík players
Danish Superliga players
Superettan players
Association football midfielders
Danish people of Ethiopian descent
Danish 1st Division players
Expatriate footballers in Sweden
Expatriate footballers in the Faroe Islands
Danish expatriate sportspeople in Sweden